"Love Would Be Enough" is the third single from Canadian country singer Dean Brody's album Gypsy Road. The song was released to radio on October 23, 2015.

Background
Brody announced the song as a single on October 23, 2015, shortly before finishing a Canada-wide tour with Paul Brandt.

The song is about a man telling his lover that even if they had nothing to their name or if they were broke, their love for each other would be enough.

Music video
The music video premiered in November 2015. The video contains footage of Brody on tour.

Chart performance

References

2015 songs
2015 singles
Dean Brody songs
Songs written by Dean Brody
Open Road Recordings singles